WXNU (106.5 FM) is a radio station licensed to St. Anne, Illinois, and serving Kankakee County, and Iroquois County in Illinois, and Newton County in Indiana.  WXNU has a country music format and is owned by STARadio.

References

External links
 WXNU's website

Country radio stations in the United States
XNU